Gopal Ganesh Agarkar (14 July 1856 – 17 June 1895) was a social reformer, educationist, and thinker from Maharashtra, India.

At one time a close associate of Bal Gangadhar Tilak, he co-founded educational institutes such as the New English School, the Deccan Education Society and Fergusson College along with Tilak, Vishnushastri Chiplunkar, Mahadev Ballal Namjoshi, V. S. Apte, V. B. Kelkar, M. S. Gole and N. K. Dharap. He was the first editor of the weekly Kesari newspaper and founder and editor of a periodical, Sudharak. He was the second principal of Fergusson College, serving in that post from August 1892 until his death.

A locality in Andheri, Mumbai is named after him as Agarkar Chowk.

Early life
Gopal Ganesh Agarkar was born on 14 July 1856 in Tembhu, a village in Karad taluk, Satara district, Maharashtra.

Agarkar was schooled in Karad and later worked as a clerk in a court there. In 1878, he received his B. A. degree, and in 1880 was awarded an M.A.

Social activism and later life 
He was the first editor of Kesari, a prominent Marathi-language weekly newspaper founded by Lokmanya Tilak in 1880–1881. Ideological differences with Tilak caused him later to leave. They disagreed on the primacy of political reform versus social reform, with Agarkar believing that the need for social reform was more immediate. He started his own periodical, Sudharak, in which he campaigned against the injustices of untouchability and the caste system. Agarkar abhorred blind adherence to and glorification of tradition and the past. He supported widow remarriage. From 1892 to 1895 he was the principal of Ferguson College.

Agarkar suffered from severe asthma throughout his life and succumbed to it on 17 June 1895.

Publications

 Futke Nashib (Biography)
 Alankar Mimmansa (अलंकार मीमांसा)
 Dongarichy Turangatil 101 divas (1882)
 Marathi translation of

References

Further reading

Aravind Ganachari [अरविंद गणाचारी]. Gopal Ganesh Agarkar - The Secular Rationalist Reformer. Popular Prakashan, India. 2005.  (3974). 

Marathi-language writers
Activists from Maharashtra
1856 births
1895 deaths
People from Satara district
Indian social reformers
Writers from Maharashtra
19th-century Indian educational theorists
Scholars from Maharashtra
People from British India